John Lillie (September 12, 1847 – May 13, 1921) was an American politician in the state of Washington. He served in the Washington House of Representatives from 1895 to 1897.

References

Republican Party members of the Washington House of Representatives
1847 births
1921 deaths
Scottish emigrants to the United States